Ali Uzair Mehmood (Urdu: علی عزیر محمود; born 14 October 1996)  is a Pakistani footballer who plays for the WAPDA as a defender and sometimes midfielder. He made his international debut on 6 June 2019 against Cambodia.

Club career
Ali Uzair plays for WAPDA in the Pakistan Premier League.

International 
Ali Uzair left for Cambodia to play the 2022 FIFA World Cup qualifiers. He debuted for Pakistan national football team in the 2022 FIFA World Cup qualifiers against Cambodia on 6 June 2019, coming on as a half-time substitution for Navid Rehman.

Career statistics

Club

References 

Living people
1996 births
Pakistani footballers
WAPDA F.C. players
Association football defenders
Pakistan international footballers